Ojcowizna  is a village in the administrative district of Gmina Brańszczyk, within Wyszków County, Masovian Voivodeship, in east-central Poland.

References

Ojcowizna